Sabesh–Murali is an Indian music director duo, who have jointly composed for many Tamil films in Chennai, India. Sabesh and Murali are siblings who began their careers working under their brother, the music director Deva, as assistant composers. They composed famous albums such as Pokkisham and Milaga. The duo are also, rarely, playback singers. They composed for the Tamil movie Imsai Arasan 23am Pulikesi. They scored the movie Goripalayam and the upcoming movie Anthony Yaar.

Personal life
Sabesh–Murali are the younger brothers of popular music composer Deva. Sabesh's son Karthik Sabesh is a comedian while Murali's son Bobo Shashi is a composer. Their nephews are actor Jai and composer Srikanth Deva.

Discography
Songs

Samuthiram (2001)
Naina (2002)
Aayiram Poi Solli (2002)
 Ball (2002)
Paarai (2003)
Ayodhya (2005)
Gurudeva (2005)
Adaikalam (2005)
Thavamai Thavamirundhu  (2005)
Suyetchai MLA (2006)
Imsai Arasan 23am Pulikesi (2006)
Perusu (2006)
Pachakuthirai (2006)
Niram (2007)
Mirugam (2007)
Mudhal Kanave (2007)
Koodal Nagar (2007)
Ammuvagiya Naan (2007)
Azhagu Nilayam (2008)
Ashoka (2008)
Indiralohathil Na Azhagappan (2008)
Pokkisham (2009)
Vaigai (2009)
Alaiyodu Vilayadu (2009)
Engal Aasan (2009)
Mayandi Kudumbathar (2009)
Milaga (2010)
Goripalayam (2010)
Mittai (2011)
Maithanam (2011)
Pechiyakka Marumagan (2012)
Sandhithathum Sindhithathum (2013)Kallapetti (2013)Sankarapuram (2014)Paranjothy (2015)Kavaathu (2017)

Background score only

Paarijatham (2006)
Thalaimagan (2006)
Arasangam (2008)
Autograph (2004)
Pattalam (2009)
Adhe Neram Adhe Idam (2009)
Sindhu Samaveli (2010)
Irumbu Kottai Murattu Singam (2010)
Kattradhu Kalavu (2010)
Ambasamuthiram Ambani (2010)
Vithagan (2011)
Kadhal Pisase (2012)
Annakodi (2013)
Mathapoo (2013)
Sivappu (2015)
Kangaroo (2015)
Yendha Nerathilum (2017)
Kodiveeran (2017)
Thirumanam (2019)
Meendum Oru Mariyadhai (2020)

Singer
Sabesh also worked as singer rendering some songs.
"Kothal Savadi Lady" - Kannedhirey Thondrinal
"Udhayam Theatre la" - Anantha Poongatre
"Otta Odasal" - Goripalayam
"Ore Oru Thopula" - Devathaiyai Kanden
"Kandhan Irukkum" - Kaadhale Nimmadhi
"Kaathadikuthu" - Ninaivirukkum Varai

References

Tamil musicians
Tamil film score composers
Musicians from Chennai
Living people
Indian musical duos
Year of birth missing (living people)